Edzard Schmidt-Jortzig (born 8 October 1941) is a German jurist. He currently holds the chair for public law at the University of Kiel. A member of the Free Democratic Party, he served as Federal Minister of Justice in the Fifth Kohl cabinet between 1996 and 1998.

Born in Berlin, Schmidt-Jortzig was raised in Lüneburg, Lower Saxony. He studied law and received his first Staatsexamen in 1966, and the second in 1969. In 1984, he became a professor of public law at the University of Kiel and joined the Free Democratic Party.

In the 1994 German federal election, he earned a seat in the Bundestag, and in 1996, he succeeded Sabine Leutheusser-Schnarrenberger as Federal Minister of Justice of Germany.

External links
Biography at the German Bundestag

1941 births
Living people
Jurists from Berlin
Justice ministers of Germany
Members of the Bundestag for Schleswig-Holstein
Members of the Bundestag 1998–2002
Members of the Bundestag 1994–1998
Academic staff of the University of Kiel
Academic staff of the University of Münster
Politicians from Berlin
Members of the Bundestag for the Free Democratic Party (Germany)